Mohammad Tamim is a Bangladeshi academic and Pro-Vice Chancellor of BRAC University.

Early life
Tamim completed his undergraduate from Bangladesh University of Engineering and Technology. He did his graduate studies in mechanical engineering at the Indian Institute of Technology Madras. He did his PhD at the University of Alberta on Petroleum Engineering.

Career
On 10 January 2008, he was appointed special assistant to the chief advisor of the caretaker government. He was placed in charge of the Ministry of Power, Energy and Mineral Resources. He was a founding chairman of Society of Petroleum Engineers, Bangladesh Section.

Jamil was a professor of Bangladesh University of Engineering and Technology. On 18 February 2019, he was appointed Pro-Vice Chancellor of BRAC University.

References

Advisors of Caretaker Government of Bangladesh
Living people
Power, Energy and Mineral Resources ministers
Year of birth missing (living people)
Bangladesh University of Engineering and Technology alumni
Academic staff of Bangladesh University of Engineering and Technology
IIT Madras alumni
University of Alberta alumni
Academic staff of BRAC University